The  was a class of minesweepers of the Imperial Japanese Navy (IJN), serving during the 1930s and World War II. 6 vessels were built in 1922–29 under the Eight-eight fleet plan. They have two sub-classes, this article handles them collectively.

Background
In 1920, the IJN developed an Eight-eight Fleet Plan which would provide them with eight modern battleships and eight battle cruisers. However, they did not forget the Hatsuse and Yashima, which had struck naval mines during the Russo-Japanese War; afraid of such events occurring again, the IJN also ordered the No.1-class of purpose-built minesweepers, to replace converted old destroyers in the minesweeping role.

As the IJN anticipated its minesweepers to operate in front of the main battle fleet, and therefore to encounter enemy warships, the No.1-class were more heavily armed than minesweepers of other nations, with each ship mounting two  L/45 naval guns. In addition each ship could carry 50 naval mines, making them multi-purpose vessels visually resembling small destroyers.

Ships in classes

No.1 class
 Project number I1. 4 vessels were built in 1922–1925. W-4 was behind with the laid down by the Washington Naval Treaty.

No.5 class
 Project number I2. 2 vessels were built in 1928–1929. Improved model of the No.1-class. About their appearance, foremast was changed to tripod type.

Photos

Footnotes

Bibliography

Ships of the World special issue Vol.45, Escort Vessels of the Imperial Japanese Navy, (Japan), February 1996
The Maru Special, Japanese Naval Vessels No.50, Japanese minesweepers and landing ships,  (Japan), April 1981

World War II mine warfare vessels of Japan
Minesweepers of Japan
Mine warfare vessel classes
Mine warfare vessels of the Imperial Japanese Navy